Elizabeth Anne "Beth" Beglin (born April 2, 1957, in Teaneck, New Jersey) is a former field hockey player from the United States, who was a member of the Women's National Team that won the bronze medal at the 1984 Summer Olympics in Los Angeles, California.

Education
Beglin grew up in Upper Saddle River, New Jersey. She attended Northern Highlands Regional High School in Allendale, New Jersey, and was inducted in 2011 into the school's hall of fame.

Olympics
Beglin qualified for the 1980 Olympic team but did not compete due to the Olympic Committee's boycott of the 1980 Summer Olympics in Moscow, Russia. She was one of 461 athletes to receive a Congressional Gold Medal years later. When the United States hosted the Games in 1984, she once again represented her native country and was part of the bronze medal team. Four years later, she was a member of the team that competed at the 1988 Summer Olympics in Seoul, South Korea.

Coaching
From 1988 to 1999, Beglin was the field hockey coach at the University of Iowa where the team won 25 straight Big Ten Conference matches from 1990 to 1993 and 45 consecutive home matches on Grant Field from 1988 to 1994.

References

External links
 
 
 databaseOlympics

1957 births
Living people
American female field hockey players
Field hockey players at the 1984 Summer Olympics
Field hockey players at the 1988 Summer Olympics
Olympic bronze medalists for the United States in field hockey
People from Teaneck, New Jersey
People from Upper Saddle River, New Jersey
Medalists at the 1984 Summer Olympics
Iowa Hawkeyes field hockey
Congressional Gold Medal recipients
21st-century American women